KUEN, virtual channel 9 (UHF digital channel 36), is an educational independent television station serving Salt Lake City, Utah, United States, that is licensed to Ogden. The station is owned by the Utah State Board of Regents, and is operated by the Utah Education Network on behalf of higher education (USHE) as well as public education (USOE). KUEN's studios are located at the Eccles Broadcast Center on the University of Utah campus, and its transmitter is located at Farnsworth Peak in the Oquirrh Mountains, southwest of Salt Lake City. The station has a large network of broadcast translators that extend its over-the-air coverage throughout Utah, as well as portions of Colorado.

History 
On March 21, 1984, the Federal Communications Commission (FCC) granted an original construction permit to Weber State College (now Weber State University) for a full-power educational television station to serve Ogden and the Salt Lake City area on VHF channel 9. The station's original call letters were KTYY, but were soon changed to KWBR (for "WeBeR State College"). The school had trouble getting the station up and running, and in March 1986, assigned the construction permit to the Utah State Board of Regents (University of Utah), which changed the station's call letters to KULC (for "Utah's Learning Channel"). KULC was licensed on February 27, 1987. In May 2001, the FCC granted permission to build a digital signal for KULC-DT, and by the end of April 2003, the station was operating under Program Test Authority. KULC-DT was licensed on August 21, 2003. In September 2004, the station changed its call letters to KUEN.

Programming 
Instructional television makes up a significant portion of the daily KUEN broadcast schedule, including learning programs aimed at K-12 students, college distance education telecourses and teacher development programs. On weekdays from 9 a.m. to 3 p.m., KUEN broadcasts programming from Utah Instructional Television (ITV). Overnight programming features telecourses from Salt Lake Community College, Utah Valley University, and the University of Utah.

The station also occasionally broadcasts programs produced by Utah State University and Weber State University. Teacher professional development workshops air on Saturdays from 9 a.m. to 5 p.m., and KUEN also offers adult educational programming for people trying to obtain their GED. In the evening, KUEN broadcasts a variety of general interest programs, with each night of the week devoted to a different topic.

Note: The above programs are supplied from a variety of independent producers. The full schedule of nightly PBS programs is broadcast by KUEN's sister station, KUED.

Digital television

Digital channels
The station's digital signal is multiplexed:

Analog-to-digital conversion
KUEN shut down its analog signal, over VHF channel 9, on June 12, 2009, as part of the federally mandated transition from analog to digital television. The station's digital signal remained on its pre-transition UHF channel 36, using PSIP to display KUEN's virtual channel as 9 on digital television receivers.

Translators 
KUEN is rebroadcast on the following translators:

See also 
 Public broadcasting
 Distance education

References

External links 
UEN-TV website
Utah Education Network website
Utah Instructional Television
voteutah.org
TV Fool Map for KUEN

Mass media in Salt Lake City
UEN
Television channels and stations established in 1986
Educational and instructional television channels
Weber State University
1986 establishments in Utah
First Nations Experience affiliates